Niphon may refer to:

 Japan (Nippon, Nihon) or the main island Honshū
 Patriarch Nephon I of Constantinople, Ecumenical Patriarch in 1310–1314
 Patriarch Niphon of Alexandria, Greek Patriarch of Alexandria in 1366–1385
 Niphon of Kafsokalyvia (1316–1411), Greek Orthodox saint and hermit
 Patriarch Nephon II of Constantinople (Saint Niphon), Ecumenical Patriarch in 1486–1488, 1497–1498 and 1502
 USS Niphon (1863), a steam ship of Union Navy in the American Civil War
 Niphon spinosus a species of grouper called the Ara